Oceanites is a genus of seabird in the austral storm petrel family. The genus name refers to the mythical Oceanids, the three thousand daughters of Tethys.

It contains the following species:
 Wilson's storm petrel, Oceanites oceanicus
 Elliot's storm petrel, Oceanites gracilis
 Pincoya storm petrel, Oceanites pincoyae

References

 
Bird genera
Taxa named by Alexander von Keyserling
Taxa named by Johann Heinrich Blasius
Taxonomy articles created by Polbot